Hugo Osvald Pärtelpoeg (7 February 1899 in , Tartu County – 29 April 1951 in Irkutsk Oblast) was an Estonian lawyer and politician.

From 18 September 1944 to 22 September 1944, he was Minister of Finance in Otto Tief's cabinet.

On 3 July 1945, the Military Chamber of the Supreme Court of the USSR sentenced Hugo Pärtelpoeg to eight years in a forced labor camp (Gulag) and five years in Russia. Pärtelpoeg died while incarcerated in 1951.

References

1899 births
1951 deaths
20th-century Estonian lawyers
Finance ministers of Estonia
Estonian military personnel of the Estonian War of Independence
University of Tartu alumni
People who died in the Gulag
Estonian people who died in Soviet detention
People from Jõgeva Parish